Calamur Viravalli Runganada Sastri (c. 1819 – 5 July 1881) was an Indian interpreter, civil servant and polyglot who was known for his mastery over Indian and foreign languages.

Early life 

Runganada Sastri was born in a poor Brahmin family from a village near Chittoor in the then North Arcot district in the year 1819. His father was reputed to be one of the greatest Sanskrit scholars of the day, but initially could not afford to have him educated. Runganada Sastri began his education at home. By the time he was eight, he had become proficient in Sanskrit. The turning point in Sastri's life came with the arrest of his father for non-payment of land rent when the former was barely twelve years old. Sastri pleaded before the District Judge Casamajor requesting his father's temporary release from prison in order to participate in an annual religious ceremony offering himself as security on his father's behalf. Moved, Casamajor not only released Sastri's father but himself undertook to educate the boy.

Runganada Sastri was initially tutored in private by Casamajor and a Chittoor missionary H. Groves. Within six months, Sastri was able to read and write English. Under Groves' tutorship, Sastri evinced keen interest in mathematics and soon advanced to the study of astronomy. To further Sastri's studies, Casamajor sent Sastri to Madras in 1836 after persuading his parents with great difficulty. Runganada Sastri studied at Bishop Corrie's Grammar School from 1836 to 1839 and the High School (later, Presidency College, Madras) from 1839 to 1842, graduating with honours in 1842.

Early career 

On completion of his graduation, Sastri wanted to teach at the College of Engineering which was being planned. But the hostile attitude of the government as well as his father's failing health forced Runganada Sastri to return to Chittoor where he got a position as a clerk in the Subordinate Judge's Court at a salary of Rs. 70. During this time, Sastri displayed his rare aptitude for languages and soon mastered Telugu, Hindustani, Persian and Kannada. When his father died soon after, he used his mastery over Indian languages to secure a job as an interpreter in the Supreme Court at Madras. While serving as interpreter, Sastri also started to master European languages like French and Latin. Sastri was soon appointed Chief Interpreter at a pay of Rs. 2,000 - 2,500 a month. When the University of Madras was established in 1857, Runganada Sastri was made a fellow of the university.

Later career 

In April 1859, there was a vacancy in the Small Claims Court Bench and Runganada Sastri was appointed to the post by the then Governor of Madras Sir Charles Trevelyan after encountering heavy opposition and racial prejudice. Runganada Sastri served as a judge of the Small Claims Court from April 1859 until his retirement with a pension on 16 February 1880.

Soon after his retirement, Runganada Sastri was nominated to the Madras Legislative Council. However, he died on 5 July 1881.

Family and descendants 

Runganada Sastri's son Calamur Sundara Sastri had four sons and a daughter. His eldest son Sir C. V. Kumaraswami Sastri served as a judge of the Madras High Court while his daughter Seethammal married Sir C. P. Ramaswami Iyer, a leading political figure in early 20th century Madras.

References 

 

1819 births
1881 deaths
Presidency College, Chennai alumni